Ladies and Gentlemen... the Grateful Dead is a four-CD live album by the Grateful Dead.  It was recorded at the April 25–29, 1971 shows at the Fillmore East in New York City. Some songs on the eponymous live album Grateful Dead were recorded at these shows as well. The album, released in October 2000, was certified Gold by the RIAA on January 6, 2002. Unlike Dick's Picks, Road Trips, Dave's Picks, and certain other of the band's archival series of live album releases, which are simply two-track stereo recordings made from the soundboard during the concert, the shows on Ladies and Gentlemen were recorded on a 16-track multitrack recorder and were mixed down to stereo just prior to the album's 2000 release.

Track listing
All tracks recorded at the Fillmore East

Personnel

Grateful Dead
Jerry Garcia – lead guitar, vocals
Bill Kreutzmann – drums
Phil Lesh – electric bass, vocals
Ron "Pigpen" McKernan – organ, percussion, harmonica, vocals
Bob Weir – rhythm guitar, vocals

Special guest appearance by:
Tom Constanten – keyboards on disc 3, tracks 6–10

Production
Compilation produced by David Lemieux
Recorded by Bob Matthews and Betty Cantor-Jackson
Mixed by Jeffrey Norman
Tape archivists: Dick Latvala, David Lemieux
Project coordinator: Cassidy Law
Archival research: Eileen Law
Cover design and lettering: Randy Tuten
Tie dye artist: James Preston
Photography: Amalie R. Rothschild, Fred Ordower
Program notes: Blair Jackson
Assistant engineer: Rudson Shurtliff

References 

Live at the Fillmore East albums
Grateful Dead live albums
2000 live albums
Grateful Dead Records live albums
Arista Records live albums